Don Kalb (born 15 October 1959) is a Dutch anthropologist, full professor of social anthropology at the University of Bergen, and an assistant professor of social sciences and cultural anthropology at Universiteit Utrecht. For many years, Kalb was a professor of sociology and social anthropology at the Central European University.

Biography

Early life and education

Kalb grew up in the municipality of Eindhoven. Born into a family of cigar and textile producers, the significant development Eindhoven experienced in the 1960s, catalyzed by the growth of the Phillips Corporation headquartered in the city, influenced Kalb to take up anthropology as a method of investigating what he describes as "the complexity, unevenness, and inequality" latent in the city's expansion.

Kalb completed his MA in cultural anthropology at the Catholic University of Nijmegen in 1988 before finishing his PhD in social sciences at the Universiteit Utrecht in 1995.

Career

In addition to ongoing his teaching and research duties, Kalb has held numerous visiting professorships and research directorships across Europe and in the United States. In 1999, Kalb was a director of the Social Consequences of Economic Transformation in Eastern Europe program at the  Institut für die Wissenschaften vom Menschen in Vienna, Austria. In 2015, Kalb was a distinguished visiting professor at the Graduate Center, CUNY in New York City as a part of the university's Advanced Research Collaborative initiative. Presently, alongside Chris Hann, Kalb directs the financialization research group at the Max Planck Institute for Social Anthropology, Halle, Germany.

Work

Kalb's work has addressed numerous topics including globalization, nationalism, labor history, and class. While he is known as a Marxist anthropologist, Kalb's scholarship has often utilized historical evidence in addition to or in lieu of fieldwork, leading to him having been described by historian Michael Hanagan as "an anthropologist, equally at home with historical methods and debates". His empirical work has been mainly on economic transformations, class, and popular and political culture in Europe, in particular the Netherlands and Central and Eastern Europe.

Expanding Class: Power and Everyday Politics in Industrial Communities, The Netherlands, 1850–1950
In Expanding Class: Power and Everyday Politics in Industrial Communities, The Netherlands, 1850–1950, Kalb examines 20th century social and economic developments in the Brabant region of the Netherlands through a case study of the region's predominately Catholic working-class families. Following E.P. Thompson, Kalb develops what he describes as a relational approach to class that attempts to explain worker quiescence through an analysis of the Brabant region's cultural and social circumstances as well as productive relations. Charles Tilly argues that the brand of relational analysis proposed in Expanding Class "incorporates some coercion and pays considerable attention to culture, but resolutely rejects both functional and competitive accounts of inequality. Kalb centers his explanation on continuously negotiated social relations. His investigation thereby provides a promising model for further anthropological work".

Focaal

Kalb is the founding editor of anthropology journal Focaal: Journal of Global and Historical Anthropology, as well as the current FocaalBlog editor. Focaal focuses primarily on intersecting anthropological and historical debates examining local case studies within a global context. According to the journal's website, Focaal advocates for "an approach that rests in the simultaneity of ethnography, processual analysis, local insights, and global vision".

Bibliography

Books

Edited Volumes

Selected articles

Selected Book Chapters

References

External links
Google Scholar Profile - Don Kalb

Political mobilization and the world system: The case of Ukraine and Russia - an Interview with Don Kalb, Volodymyr Ishchenko, and Anastasia Riabchuk

Social anthropologists
Cultural anthropologists
Dutch anthropologists
Utrecht University alumni
Radboud University Nijmegen alumni
Academic journal editors
1959 births
Living people
Academic staff of Central European University
Academic staff of Utrecht University